Sylk Magazine is an online men's magazine launched in June 2004. Sylk features a mix of socio-political editorial combined with pictorials of scantily clad female models (the "Sylk Girls"). Sylk Magazine was one of the first men's magazines to forsake print and embrace 100% Internet distribution.

Overview
Sylk Magazine started in 2004 as an online publication. It addresses national and global socio-political topics such as foreign policy, environmental issues, and social issues, outlining problems and looking at their causes and their wider implications on culture. It does not feature content on pop culture.

Sylk Girls
Sylk Magazines "Sylk Girls" are women new to modelling, many having never shot anything before Sylk, rather than popular models, celebrities, and debutantes. The purpose is to give new models exposure.

Sylk Magazine focuses both on the models' physical attributes and on their personal attributes. Sylk Pictorials outline each model's personality, intelligence, and accomplishments.

Glamor photography is usually identified with the use of makeup styling and heavy post-processing (air brushing) of images, often to the degree of reshaping body and facial features. However, Sylk Magazine prefers to keep the models makeup light/casual and minimize the retouching of images so that the Sylk Girls have a more natural appearance.

Sylk pictorials use an interactive layout broken into pages, with three photos and part of the model's bio on each page. The layout allows readers to quickly switch between photos without leaving the page and to enlarge the photos they want to see in more detail, without the use of Flash.

Marketing
The name "Sylk" was chosen because the fabric silk is associated with elegance, high quality, and intimate and sexual connotations. Additionally, "Sylk" was chosen as a name because silk is a luxury item that people often use without thinking about its history and the political influences of the silk trade. The misspelling is intended to represent the magazine as having a rebellious nature.

Sylk Magazine originally had the tag line "Nothing is Sexier Than Sylk", before switching in 2005 to "Sylk Magazine: Art, Politics & Sex". ("Art, Politics & Sex" are stated to represent the "three pillars" upon which society is built.) In 2007, "All Juice, No Pulp" was added to emphasize the magazine's purely online nature, and "A Smarter Men's Magazine" was added after a Fleshbot posting calling the magazine "T&A for the thinking man".

Europe
In April 2007, Sylk Magazine partnered with Turkish company MobilARGE Ltd. for mobile distribution in Europe.

Versions
There is a free mobile version with the latest articles and recent pictorials.
There is also a "Work Safe" version that has no photos, only articles. Sylks newsletter described this as "All the sass none of the ass!"

References

External links
 Official website

Men's magazines published in the United States
Monthly magazines published in the United States
Online magazines published in the United States
Men's magazines published in the United Kingdom
Magazines established in 2004
Magazines published in Arizona
Mass media in Phoenix, Arizona
Men's websites